Serianthes vitiensis is a species of flowering plant in the family Fabaceae. It is found only in Fiji.

References

vitiensis
Endemic flora of Fiji
Vulnerable plants
Taxonomy articles created by Polbot